Fernand Joseph Jules Stiévenart (21 May 1862 in Douai – 22 January 1922 in Uccle) was a French landscape painter; associated with the artists' colony at Wissant.

Biography 
After completing his primary education in Douai, he began his artistic studies with a local painter, François-Constant Petit (1819-?). From 1878 to 1880, he studied at the École des Beaux-arts with Gustave Boulanger and others; winning several awards.

In 1888, he exhibited several landscapes at the "Salon des Artistes Français", but it was not until 1893 that he joined the Société des Artistes Français.

He and his wife, the artist Juliette De Reul (1872-1925), daughter of the Belgian novelist , lived in Douai until the late 1890s, when they settled in Wissant and opened a studio. Later, their workshop would be occupied by the graphic artist, Paule Crampel (1864-1964), widow of the explorer Paul Crampel.

He was awarded a bronze medal at the Exposition Universelle (1900). Toward the end of his life, he and Juliette moved to Uccle, where they had built a large mansion.

References

Further reading 
Michèle Moyne-Charlet, Anne Esnault, Annette Bourrut Lacouture and Yann Gobert-Sergent, Visages de Terre et de Mer - Regards de peintres à Wissant à la fin du 19e siècle, SilvanaEditoriale, 2014 
 Franck Dufossé, Histoire de Wissant, des origines aux années 1930, Éditions A.M.A., 2002

External links 

Fernand Stiévenart website with documents, photographs and a gallery.

1862 births
1922 deaths
19th-century French painters
20th-century French painters
20th-century French male artists
École des Beaux-Arts
French landscape painters
People from Douai
19th-century French male artists